Pseudopomala is a genus of slant-faced grasshoppers in the family Acrididae. There is one described species in Pseudopomala, P. brachyptera.

References

Further reading

 
 
 

Acrididae genera
Articles created by Qbugbot
Gomphocerinae